Malopoets were a musical group formed in the Republic of South Africa by Patrick Sefolosha and Kenny Mathaba in 1978 in Johannesburg.
The group has produced three studio albums: Fire (1982), Malopoets (1985) and Life is for Living (1988).

History

The Malopoets group was formed on July 17, 1978, the 11-th anniversary of the death of John Coltrane. Patrick Sefolosha, the Malopoets' leader in the 1980s, described Coltrane as "the godfather of the group".

For a while during the 1980s the group was based in Switzerland. In mid-1980s the group included Patrick Sefolosha, Bruce Sosibo, Sam Shabalala, Pat Mokoka, Moss Manaka and Mervyn Africa. Malopoets released their second album, Malopoets, in 1985; the album was recorded in Paris. 
In 1985 they also released a single Sound of the People (through EMI).

The band broke up in early 1986.

References

Sources

External links
Malopoets at Discogs

South African musical groups